Child's Play is an American television game show in which adult contestants tried to guess words based on definitions given by children. The Mark Goodson-produced series debuted on CBS on September 20, 1982 and ended on September 16, 1983.

This was the first game show created and produced solo by Mark Goodson after the death of his longtime business partner Bill Todman in 1979; all subsequent shows made by Goodson (including the existing Goodson-Todman programs that were still airing at the time) were credited as "A Mark Goodson Television Production", with a new logo reflecting the company's name change.

Hosts and announcers
Child's Play was hosted by game show veteran Bill Cullen. This was both Cullen's final game on CBS and his last for Mark Goodson, ending a 30-year association with the Goodson company as an emcee. Gene Wood was the primary announcer for the entire run, with Johnny Gilbert and Bob Hilton (who also announced on the pilot) filling in on occasion.

Cullen first plugged the show during his only appearance on Bob Barker's version of The Price Is Right on October 26, 1982.

Main game
Two contestants competed. The object of the game was to correctly identify words based on videotaped definitions given by elementary school-age children (ages 5–9). The game was played in two rounds.

Round 1
In the first round, a word was given to the home audience, and a video clip of a child defining that word was played (e.g. a child stating "it's something you use to unlock a door to a house or a car" to define "key"). Any mentions of the word or some form of it were bleeped out, as were any other words that were judged unsuitable for broadcast.

Once the clip ended, the contestant had a chance to guess the word; a correct response earned one point. If the contestant was incorrect, his/her opponent viewed a clip of another child defining the same word. If the opponent was wrong, control passed back to the first contestant, who saw one final clip. If the contestant was still wrong, no points were awarded.

The first round continued, with the players alternating control on words (originally the winner of the previous word played first on each new word), until the second commercial break.

Round 2: Fast Play
Both contestants were given the opportunity to guess what word the child was defining by hitting a buzzer to interrupt the video clip and guess the word. Two points were given for a correct answer, and if the player buzzed in with an incorrect guess the rest of the clip was played for the opponent before he/she was given the opportunity to guess. Play continued until a school bell rang to end the game, and whoever was ahead won $500 and advanced to the bonus round. If the game ended in a tie, one additional word was played.

In the first three episodes, Fast Play was played in two halves, with the school bell ringing twice. In the first half answers were worth one point and doubled after the bell rang the first time. Also, if a contestant buzzed in with an incorrect guess the opponent got to see the entire clip from the beginning again. This rule was discontinued in favor of the rules above.

Bonus round
Two different bonus round formats were used, each with a $5,000 top prize and a 45-second time limit.

Format 1: Triple Play
In the original bonus round, the winner of the main game tried to guess words based on definitions written by three children ("Child A", "Child B", and "Child C"). The contestant started by picking one of the three children, whose definition was then read by Cullen, and then either provided a guess or chose another child's definition. If the player was not able to guess the word after seeing all three definitions, they passed to the next word.

Each correct guess was worth $100, while getting six before time expired won $5,000.

Format 2: Turnabout
In this round, instituted on April 25, 1983, the winner was joined by five of the children who were appearing in the film clips and had to describe seven words to them. Each time the champion got a correct answer from a child, they won $100 for themselves and the children won $100 to be split among them. The champion was able to pass and return to a word if time permitted. If the champion was able to get the children to guess all seven words within the time limit, he/she won $5,000 for him/herself and the five children shared $1,000.

If the player gave an illegal clue (such as saying the word or any form of it), the word was eliminated from play.

Champions returned until they were defeated, won five consecutive games, or reached the winnings limit CBS imposed on its game shows, which at the time was $25,000.

Broadcast history
Child's Play premiered at 10:30 a.m. EST on September 20, 1982 (immediately following The New $25,000 Pyramid, which debuted the same day), replacing reruns of Alice (which had held the timeslot since June 2, 1980 as a result of the cancellation of Whew!). Child's Play faced off against the NBC game shows Wheel of Fortune and, beginning in January 1983, Sale of the Century. However, it was not able to make any ratings headway against either of those shows. As a result, in the summer of 1983, CBS canceled Child's Play; its final episode aired on September 16 of that year. The following Monday, the show's timeslot would be filled by Press Your Luck, which would perform much better for CBS against Sale of the Century and would consequently remain in the 10:30 a.m. timeslot until January 1986.

Episode status
The series is intact, and has been seen on GSN at various times. The show has also aired on Buzzr.

Notable contestants
Several celebrities appeared on Child's Play before they became famous: Suzan Stadner aka Hanala Sagal (actress/writer), Jeff Cohen, Breckin Meyer, Masi Oka,  Tara Reid and Adam Richman were all featured children on the show. In addition, Anne-Marie Johnson appeared as a contestant. Also, Sugar Ray Robinson appeared in the audience of the July 4, 1983 episode, and Bill Cullen introduced him as the boxing coach of one of the Child's Play kids participating in the Turnabout game.

International versions

Descriptions

Australia
Australia ran their version for a brief period in 1984, hosted by former pop star and host of Happening 71–72 Jeff Phillips.

Germany
Germany ran their successful version of Child's Play under the name Dingsda ("Gizmo/Whatsit") on Bayerischer Rundfunk from 1985-2000 with Fritz Egner from 1985–1994, followed by Werner Schmidbauer from 1994–2000. Then a year later, a revival of the show ran on kabel eins with Thomas Ohrner for a brief period from 2001–02. Sixteen years later, the show has now been remade for Das Erste with Mareile Höppner since 2018.

Greece
Their short-lived version titled Tα παiδíα παíζεi (Children Play) originally ran on ERT2 from 1987–1988 with Lefteris Eleftheriadis as host. ten years later, its revival
ran on ANT1 for a brief period in 1998 hosted by Isabella Vlassiadou.

Indonesia
ran their version of Child's Play from 1996–98 on antv under the name Kata Si Kecil ("The Little's Says"), hosted by Kepra. In 2001-2005, Indosiar reincarnated the show again under the name Celoteh Anak ("Child's Talk"), with Dewi Hughes as the host. Then back to the "host of the show", antv again revival this shows with a new concept and atmosphere with the name Apa..?? Apa..?? Apa..?? ("What...?? What...?? What...???") with host Harsya Subandrio from 2010 to 2011.

Netherlands
had two different versions of Child's Play running on NCRV, the first version was called t Is Kinderspel ("It's Child's Play") running for a brief period in 1984 hosted by Fred de Graaf. one year later, the show was revived under the new name of Dinges ("Whatchamacallit") which had a much more successful run than its precursor from 1986-1995. the original host was Martine Bijl from 1986-1988 followed by Frank Masmeijer from 1989–1993. Its third and final host of the series was Jo de Poorter (of Familieraad fame) in 1995.

Russia
Уcтaми млaденцa (Mouths of Babes/Baby Lips) hosted by Alexander Gurevich originally ran from 1992–1996 and 1999–2000 on PTP and on HTB from 1997–1998. Thirteen years later, the show had a short-lived revival on Disney Channel Russia hosted by Maxim Vitorgan in 2013-2014. Two years later, the series was revived again on channel HTB now hosted by Alexey Kortnev from 2016 until 2017 then he was later replaced by Alexander Oleshko from 2017 until 2018. In 2020, the series was revived on Russia 1, hosted by Olga Shelest who was later replaced by Evgeniy Rybov since season 2.

It was the first game show officially licensed in Russia.

Spain
Their version is called Juego de niños ("Child's Play") running on TVE from 1988–1992. unlike previous international versions, when a contestant guesses a word correctly he or she earns a "Gallifantes" (a puppet like creature) and at the end of the show, whoever gets the most "Gallifantes'" was the winner of the day also unlike the other previous international versions, this one in particular had four host the first host was Amparo Soler Leal from 1988-1989 then he was replaced by Tina Sáinz from 1989-1990 then Ignacio Salas from 1989-1990 and finally, Javier Sardá from 1991-1992.

Sweden
Their version is called Lekande Lätt ("Swimmingly/Light as") aired on Svergies Television from 1987-2001, hosted by Kjell Lönnå then from 2002 until 2003 hosted by Erik Nyberg.

Spanish (US)
On September 15, 2008, FremantleMedia, owners of the Goodson-Todman catalog of games, revived Child's Play in the Spanish-speaking market as Dame la Pista''' ("Give Me a Clue"), hosted by Alessandra Rosaldo on Univision-owned TeleFutura. This show was the lead-in to ¿Qué dice la gente?, a Spanish-language version of Family Feud, during its run. The show was eventually cancelled.

United Kingdom
see under: the long-running 1984-1988 British version, hosted by Michael Aspel. Clips from this version were seen in the 1985 special called TV's Funniest Game Show Moments #2''.

Vietnam
The Vietnamese version, called "Chuyện nhỏ" (Small Story) was aired in two separate runs (2005 - 2007; 2010 - 2014) on HTV7 at 7 p.m. every Saturday and hosted by Thanh Bạch in both runs. Repeats of the 2005 - 2007 episodes had been aired on HTV3 (Entertainment for Kids and Families channel) since 2013.

References

External links
  (1982-1983 US Version)
  (1984-1988 UK Version)
  (1985-2000/2001-2002 German version) (Gizmo/Whatsit)
  (2008 Spanish version) (Give Me A Clue)
  (1988-1992 Spain version)
 Child's Play @ pearsontv.com (via Internet Archive)
 description of "Dingsda" from its (new website) (Germany)
 description of "Dingsda" from its (old website) (Germany)
 description of "'t Is Kinderspel" (Netherlands)
 description of "Dinges" (Netherlands)
 description of "Play Game" (United States)

1982 American television series debuts
1983 American television series endings
1980s American game shows
CBS original programming
English-language television shows
Television series about children
Television series by Fremantle (company)
Television series by Mark Goodson-Bill Todman Productions